The Cup of Russia in artistic gymnastics, or Russian Cup in artistic gymnastics is an annual Russian national artistic gymnastics competition. It is organized by the Ministry of Sports and the Artistic Gymnastics Federation of Russia and is financed from the federal budget. In the recent years, the Russian Cup is traditionally held in August and serves as a qualifying tournament for the autumn World Championships.

Medalists

Women

All-around

Men

All-around

References

External links 
 Official website of the Russian Artistic Gymnastics Federation 

 
Russia Cup
Gymnastics competitions in Russia